Chelsea Dungee (born May 11, 1997) is an American basketball player who is an assistant coach for the Troy Trojans women's basketball team. She played college basketball at Oklahoma for one season and Arkansas for four seasons.

High school
Dungee played two years each at Preston High School, in Preston, Oklahoma, and Sapulpa High School, in Sapulpa, Oklahoma. During her time at Preston, she helped the team to the OSSAA class AA state championship, averaging over 25 points per game. Following her sophomore season, she was named Gatorade State Player of the Year for the state of Oklahoma.

College career
Dungee played her freshman season at Oklahoma before transferring to Arkansas for her final three varsity seasons. She was named an All-American by the Associated Press and the WBCA as a senior.

Oklahoma and Arkansas statistics

Source

WNBA career statistics

Regular season

|-
| align="left" | 2021
| align="left" | Dallas
| 14 || 0 || 4.6 || .176 || .200 || .000 || 0.2 || 0.1 || 0.0 || 0.1 || 0.1 || 0.6
|-
| align="left" | Career
| align="left" | 1 year, 1 team
| 14 || 0 || 4.6 || .176 || .200 || .000 || 0.2 || 0.1 || 0.0 || 0.1 || 0.1 || 0.6

Playoffs

|-
| align="left" | 2021
| align="left" | Dallas
| 1 || 0 || 1.0 || .000 || .000 || .000 || 0.0 || 0.0 || 0.0 || 0.0 || 0.0 || 0.0
|-
| align="left" | Career
| align="left" | 1 year, 1 team
| 1 || 0 || 1.0 || .000 || .000 || .000 || 0.0 || 0.0 || 0.0 || 0.0 || 0.0 || 0.0

Overseas career
On 20 May 2021, she signed a one-year contract with Galatasaray.

References

External links
WNBA draft profile
USA Basketball bio

1997 births
Living people
All-American college women's basketball players
American women's basketball players
Arkansas Razorbacks women's basketball players
Basketball players from Oklahoma
Dallas Wings draft picks
Dallas Wings players
Oklahoma Sooners women's basketball players
People from Okmulgee, Oklahoma
Shooting guards
Galatasaray S.K. (women's basketball) players